Georges-Henri Bousquet (21 June 1900, Meudon – 23 January 1978, Latresne) was a 20th-century French jurist, economist and Islamologist. He was a professor of law at the Faculty of Law of the University of Algiers where he was a specialist in the sociology of North Africa (Berbers, Islam). He is also known for his translation work of the great Muslim authors, Al-Ghazali, a theologian who died in 1111 and Tunisian historian Ibn Khaldun (1332-1406). He was known as a polyglot, spoke several European languages (Dutch, his second mother tongue, English, German, Italian, but also Spanish, Danish, Norwegian) and Eastern ones (Arabic, Malay).

Biography 
After studying law, economics and political science in Paris, Bousquet was appointed in 1927 as a lecturer in economics at the Faculty of Law of Algiers. By this time, he learned Arabic and became interested in Islamic studies while preparing the agrégation in political economy which he passed in 1932. He became a professor and continued his academic career in Algiers for three decades, as an economist and scholar of Islam. The titles of his chair were successively Économie et sociologie nord-africaine (in 1947), to become Histoire comparée des coutumes de l’Islam et économie et sociologie algériennes one year later and finally Droit musulman et sociologie nord-africaine. After the independence of Algeria, Bousquet moved to Bordeaux to complete his academic career: he taught both Muslim sociology and the history of economic thought.

Publications 
 1924: Les tendances nouvelles de l'école autrichienne, Revue d'économie politique, septembre-octobre
 1929: Joseph Schumpeter: l'œuvre scientifique de quelques économistes étrangers, Revue d'économie politique
 1930: Introduction à la science économique, Paris, Giard
 1932: Les bases du système économique, Paris, Giard
 1933: Les trois notions de l'équilibre économique, Econometrica, 1 (2), août
 1936: La production et son marché, Paris, Giard
 1941: L'islam maghrébin. Introduction à l'étude générale de l'islam
 1949: Les grandes pratiques rituelles de l'islam, Paris : PUF
 1950:
 a. dir., Préface et notes éditoriales, Adam Smith. Textes choisis, Paris : Dalloz-Sirey
 b. L'Islam et la limitation volontaire des naissances, brèves réflexions sur un grand problème social, Population (Institut national d'études démographiques), n°1, January–March, pp. 121–128
 c. Précis de Droit musulman, principalement malékite et algérien, Alger, La Maison des Livres, 2éd., 2 tomes
 d. L'islam maghrébin, Alger : La Maison des livres
 1953: La Morale de l'Islam et son éthique sexuelle, Paris : A. Maisonneuve (Constantine, impr. de Attali)
 1955: with J. Crisafulli, dir., nouvelle édition analysée avec bibliographie, introduction et notes du livre de Ferdinando Galiani, De la Monnaie, Paris, Librairie M. Rivière
 1956: Le montant total des richesses d'une nation est-il une grandeur constante ? Le paradoxe de Graslin, Revue économique, Vol 7, n°4, pp. 605–613
 1957: Les Berbères : histoire et institutions, Paris : Presses universitaires de France, Collection Que sais-je ?
 1958:
 a. Un centenaire: l'œuvre de H. H. Gossen et sa véritable structure, Revue d'économie politique, Vol 68, pp499–523
 b. Histoire de l'économie mathématique jusqu'à Cournot, Metroeconomica, 10, pp121–135
 1958: A. C. Pigou, Paris : Dalloz-Sirey
 1959: Un précurseur totalement inconnu de l'étude mathématique du revenu national : Joseph Lang, Revue économique, Vol 10, n°2, pp. 268–274
 1960:
 a. Pareto, 1848-1923, le savant et l'homme, Lausanne : Payot et Cie
 b. Clément Colson, Paris : Dalloz-Sirey
 c. Esquisse d'une histoire de la science économique en Italie. des origines à Francesco Ferrara, Paris : M. Rivière
 1962: traduction en français du texte de Joseph Schumpeter écrit en 1914, Epochen der Dogmen und Methoden Geschichte, In: Grundriss der Sozialökonomik, Section I, Tübingen, pp. 81 sqq, In: Esquisse d'une histoire de la science économique, des origines au début du XXe siècle, Paris : Dalloz
 1963: Le droit musulman, Paris : Armand Collin
 1964: L'autobibliographie inédite de Léon Walras (1906), Revue économique, Vol 15, n°2, pp295–304
 1965: Études sur Pareto et les doctrines économiques, politiques, sociales et sociologiques de son époque offertes à M. Georges-Henri Bousquet... à l'occasion de son 65e anniversaire, Genève : Droz
 1966:
 a. Deux visions de l'ensemble économique. Francesco Ferrara et E. von Böhm-Bawerk, Revue économique, Vol 17, n°3, pp337–361
 b. L'éthique sexuelle de l'Islam, Desclée de Brouwer
 c. review of the book of Marcel van Meerhaeghe, De economie van Vlaanderen, Revue d'économie politique, vol. 76,  (March-April 1966),  
 1967:
 a. Les Mormons, Paris : Presses universitaires de France, Collection Que sais-je ?, 2nd édition mise à jour
 b. Le hasard. Son rôle dans l'histoire des sociétés, Annales. Économies, Sociétés, Civilisations, Vol 22, n°2, pp. 419–428
 1970:
 a. commentaire du livre de Jacques Rueff, Les Dieux et les Rois. Regards sur le pouvoir créateur, Revue économique, Vol 21, n°1, pp166–169
 b. Commentaire du livre de Jacques Rueff, Des sciences physiques aux sciences morales (un essai de 1922, reconsidéré en 1969), Revue économique, Vol 21, n°6, pp1048–1049
 1972: commentaire sur le recueil de textes de Carl Menger, volume II in German, Gesammelte Werke, published by Friedrich Hayek, Revue économique, Vol 23, n°1, January, p. 166
 1973: commentaire du livre d'Erich Schneider, Joseph A. Schumpeter, Leben und Werk eines grossen Sozialökonomen, Revue économique, Vol 24, n°4, pp. 714–715

Further reading 
 1958: Jean Pelletier, commentaire du livre de Georges Henri Bousquet, Les Berbères, Revue de géographie de Lyon, Vol 33, n°4, pp. 385–386
 1962: Jean Lhomme, commentaire du livre de Georges Henri Bousquet, Pareto (1848-1923), le savant et l'homme, Revue économique, Vol 13, n°1, p. 142
 1968: Jean-Paul Charnay, commentaire du livre de Georges Henri Bousquet, L'Ethique sexuelle de l'Islam, Archives des sciences sociales des religions, Vol 25, n°25, p. 172

References 

French Arabists
Arabic–French translators
French orientalists
French economists
French jurists
People from Meudon
1900 births
1978 deaths
20th-century translators
20th-century jurists